Fatima Rahimi (born 1992) is an Afghan-Czech journalist and presenter of Hergot! on Czech Radio's Radio Wave.

Rahimi was born in 1992 in Herat. Her father was a Persian teacher before the Taliban jailed him. In 1999, her family traveled by foot, arriving in Czech Republic in 2000 where they lived in a refugee camp in Vyšní Lhoty for 3.5 years. Her family was granted permanent residency in 2004 and moved to Šumperk. She studied transcultural communication at University of Hradec Králové from 2010 to 2013. Rahimi attended Charles University, studying the cultural and spiritual history of Europe and Iranian studies.

She is a journalist for Deník Referendum.

On the 2021 Taliban offensive, Rahimi shared that many Afghans do not trust the Taliban and that there are concerns about the welfare of women in Herat.

Rahimi is a naturalized Czech citizen. She resides in Prague. Rahimi identifies a feminist and liberal Muslim.

References

External links 

 

Living people
1992 births
People from Herat
21st-century Afghan women writers
Afghan women journalists
Afghan emigrants to the Czech Republic
Naturalized citizens of the Czech Republic
Charles University alumni
Czech women journalists
21st-century Czech women writers